Bigger Picture (foaled  February 8, 2011, in Kentucky) is an American Thoroughbred racehorse whose wins included the Grade 1 United Nations Handicap plus three consecutive editions of the  John B. Connally Turf Cup.

Career

Bigger Picture's first race was on December 7, 2013, at Turfway Park, where he did not finish. He completed his second race however en route to victory on January 1, 2014.

Bigger Picture spent his 2014 and 2015 seasons competing in various claiming races, picking up some wins along the way.  During the 2016 season he competed in the Grade 1 United Nations Stakes, finishing eighth. He won his first graded race on November 12, 2016, at the Red Smith Handicap.

He picked up his first of two wins in his 2017 season by winning the Grade -3 John B. Connally Turf Cup, on January 29, 2017. 

His second win of the 2017 season came on July 1, when he competed again in the Grade-1 United Nations Stakes. He came into the race at 10–1 odds and in a major upset was victorious. He finished on the podium at both the July 2017 Bowling Green Handicap and the August 2017 Sword Dancer Stakes.

He started off his 2018 season with a successful defense of his John B. Connally Turf Cup crown by coming in first place. He did not win any more races in 2018, but came close with a third-place finish at the 2018 United Nations Stakes.

He won the John B. Connally Turf Cu] for the third time on January 27, 2019. He also added another victory to his name by winning the 2019 Elkhorn Stakes.
 This was his final win of 2019.

Pedigree

References

2011 racehorse births